Dendrobium dickasonii is a species of orchid. It is native to Thailand, Myanmar (Burma) and the Assam region of northeastern India.

References

dickasonii
Orchids of Assam
Orchids of Myanmar
Orchids of Thailand
Plants described in 1840